Faumi Syahreza (born 29 March 1993) is an Indonesian professional footballer who plays as a midfielder.

Club career

Persijap Jepara
In January 2017, he joined Persijap Jepara for the 2017 Liga 2.

Persiraja Banda Aceh
He had previously played for Persiraja Banda Aceh.

References

External links

1993 births
Living people
Indonesian footballers
Sportspeople from Aceh
Association football midfielders
Persiraja Banda Aceh players
Persijap Jepara players
Liga 2 (Indonesia) players